Procamelus is an extinct genus of camel endemic to North America. The name is derived from the Greek πρό, meaning "before" or denoting priority of order, and κάμελος ("camel"), thus meaning "fore-camel", "early camel" or "predecessor camel".

 
Unlike modern camelids, it had a pair of small incisor teeth in the upper jaw. The remaining teeth were large and adapted for eating tough vegetation. The shape of the toes suggests that it possessed foot pads, like modern camels, unlike earlier forms of camelid, which generally had hooves. This would have helped it walk over relatively soft ground. It had a straighter neck than Oxydactylus or Aepycamelus.

References 

Prehistoric camelids
Prehistoric even-toed ungulate genera
Miocene even-toed ungulates
Zanclean extinctions
Miocene mammals of North America
Aquitanian genus first appearances
Barstovian
Clarendonian
Hemphillian
Fossil taxa described in 1858
Taxa named by Joseph Leidy